Qaleh-ye Gol (also Romanized as Qal‘eh-ye Gol and Qal‘eh Gol; also known as Qal‘eh-i-Gulāb and Qal‘eh-ye Golāb) is a village in Doshman Ziari Rural District, in the Central District of Kohgiluyeh County, Kohgiluyeh and Boyer-Ahmad Province, Iran. At the 2006 census, its population was 374, in 73 families.

References 

Populated places in Kohgiluyeh County